Seathwaite is a small hamlet in Borrowdale valley in the Lake District of Cumbria, North West England.

The name derives from a combination of the Old Norse words
sef (sedges) and thveit (clearing) and may be taken to mean "clearing in the sedges".

The name, then spelled Seuthwayt, first appeared in written records in 1340.

History

Along the nearby Newhouse Gill, which descends from Grey Knotts, is a graphite mine which 
was opened after the discovery of graphite there in 1555. The extracted graphite was eventually used to supply the Derwent Cumberland Pencil Company factory in Keswick.
The commercial mining of the unusual solid form of graphite found near the hamlet of Seathwaite ceased around 1891 when veins of the solid graphite became harder to find. In addition, around that time the Keswick pencil factories had switched to making pencil pigments out of the familiar combination of clay powder and graphite powder. Graphite powder could be mined and imported from elsewhere.

For many years Seathwaite was a secluded spot, being connected to the main road at Seatoller by a rough track. However the emergence of fellwalking as an outdoor activity at the end of the 19th century led to the hamlet becoming a popular starting point for walkers bound for the surrounding mountains. The road was eventually surfaced, which led to motorists parking their cars along the verges on the approach to the farm. Seathwaite has become one of the most popular starting points for walking in the UK since it gives access to well-known mountains such as Scafell Pike, Great Gable and Glaramara. Famed Lakeland walker Alfred Wainwright made this comment:

Governance
Seathwaite is within the Copeland UK Parliamentary constituency and the North West England European Parliamentary constituency. Trudy Harrison is the Member of parliament.

Before Brexit for the European Parliament its residents voted to elect MEP's for the North West England constituency.

For Local Government purposes it is in the Keswick Ward of Allerdale Borough Council and the Keswick Division of Cumbria County Council.

Seathwaite has its own Parish Council; Borrowdale Parish Council.

Climate

In September 1966 five inches of rain fell on Seathwaite and the surrounding fells in an hour, the resulting flood severely damaging the nearby Stockley Bridge, which lies 1200 yards south of the hamlet. Stockley Bridge is an ancient packhorse bridge on the old route between Borrowdale and the Cumbrian coast. The bridge was widened in 1887 and had to be repaired after the 1966 storm.
On 19–20 November 2009 Seathwaite received  of rain in a 24-hour period, a major contributor to the 2009 Cumbria and southwest Scotland floods. This was a record for the amount of rain falling anywhere in the UK within 24 hours, until it was beaten in December 2015.

See also

Listed buildings in Borrowdale
 Cumbrian placename etymology

Notes and references 

Hamlets in Cumbria